Bezeq is an Israeli telecommunications company. Bezeq and its subsidiaries offer a range of telecom services, including fixed-line, mobile telephony, high-speed Internet, transmission, and pay TV (via Yes).

History
Bezeq was founded in 1984 as a government-owned corporation, taking over the provision of telephony services in Israel, which had been run directly by the Ministry of Communications. The previous system was highly bureaucratic, requiring customers to wait lengthy periods of time for a telephone line.

In the late 1980s Anat Hoffman founded a group to protect the interests of Bezeq customers. A major complaint was that Bezeq did not send customers itemized bills. 46 cases were brought to small claims court and the consumers won 43 of them. Within two years of the campaign. consumers began to receive itemized bills.

In 1994, Bezeq acquired 50% ownership of Pelephone, Israel's first mobile communication company, in 2004 acquired  full ownership of the company from its co-owner Motorola.

In 1998, Bezeq co-founded Yes, a direct-broadcast satellite provider, which began broadcasting in July 2000.

In January 2012, Bezeq International Optical System was completed, a submarine telecommunication cable linking Tel Aviv and Bari in Italy. The system spans 2,300 km of cable, and extended terrestrially from Bari through Interoute's network to major European cities.

In April 2012, Bezeq acquired full ownership of Walla! Communications, Israel's leading Internet portal, which has more than 2.5 million monthly unique users. In December 2020, Bezeq sold its 100% stake in Walla! Communications. Bezeq operates the B144 directory enquiries service.

In February 2015, Bezeq acquired full ownership of Yes, Israel's leading television provider, for ₪680 million.

Loss of monopoly status
In 1994,  Cellcom a new Mobile communication company was founded, breaking Pelephone's monopoly in this area. In 1999, a third competitor, Partner Communications Company, was established.

In 1997, two new competitors were introduced in international calling services (Barak and Golden Lines), and Bezeq was obliged to establish a new subsidiarity to compete with them named Bezeq International.

Until the mid-first decade of the 21st century when it was owned by the Israeli government, Bezeq had a monopoly on landline telephony and Internet access infrastructure (ADSL VDSL2). Though still the most dominant provider of telephone services, it has had competition from the sole cable provider in the country (since September 2006), Hot, which offers a cables based telephone and internet access services as of 2005, and with 012 Smile and more recently 013 netvision and Orange.

Privatization
On 9 May 2005, Israel's Government Companies Authority, headed by Eyal Gabbai privatized Bezeq when 30% of its shares were sold by the state to the Apax-Saban-Arkin investment group for $972 million.

The cellular communications provider Pelephone is a fully owned subsidiary of Bezeq. Bezeq is also the largest shareholder in D.B.S. Satellite Services (1998) Ltd., known by its trademark name, Yes, the DBS television provider in Israel.

In April 2010, the controlling interest in Bezeq, held by the Apax-Saban-Arkin group, was sold to B Communications, a subsidiary of Shaul Elovitch's Eurocom Group, for $1.75 billion.

In late 2017, bank filed a petition against Elovitch to break up Eurocom Group to pay back loans totaling $275 million.  This would directly impact the 10% shareholding in Bezeq, including Elovitch's 26% controlling stake. Meir Shamir has expressed interest in buying a controlling stake, effectively cancelling the debt to the banks.   Two other investors have also expressed interest in purchasing a stake in Bezeq, including Argentine investor Eduardo Elsztain and Elliott Management, who announced they had recently purchased a 4,8% stake.

Police investigation and graft probe

In 2018 the company announced that company CEO Stella Handler would be resigning her position. She is one of several Bezeq employees under investigation by the Israel Securities Authority and the Israel Police regarding Bezeq's purchase of Yes shares and allegations of improper dealings with the Israeli Ministry of Communication. Also in 2018, board members Shaul Elovitch, Or Elovitch and Orna Elovitch resigned as a result of Case 4000, an ongoing corruption investigation involving the former Prime Minister of Israel Benjamin Netanyahu.

Involvement in Israeli settlements

On 12 February 2020, the United Nations published a database of 112 companies helping to further Israeli settlement activity in the West Bank, including East Jerusalem, as well as in the occupied Golan Heights. These settlements are considered illegal under international law. Bezeq was listed on the database on account of its "provision of services and utilities supporting the maintenance and existence of settlements" and "the use of natural resources, in particular water and land, for business
purposes" in these occupied territories.

On 5 July 2021, Norway's largest pension fund KLP said it would divest from Bezeq together with 15 other business entities implicated in the UN report for their links to Israeli settlements in the occupied West Bank.

Operations
The company's fixed-line domestic communications segment offers domestic carrier services, including basic telephony, Internet infrastructure and access services, and transmission and data communications services. This segment also provides infrastructure, transmission, billing, leasing space, and related services for other communications operators, operates and maintains radio transmitters, carries out set-up and operation works of networks or sub-networks for various customers and offers virtual private networks, data center, and search engine services.

Parent company
B Communications, founded in 1999 as 012 Smile.Communications, is a publicly traded company. It currently functions as a holding company of Bezeq and is headquartered in Ramat Gan, Israel. Its shares are traded on the NASDAQ Global Select Market and on the Tel Aviv Stock Exchange. B Communications is controlled by Searchlight II BZQ L.P  (60%) and TNR investments Ltd (11%).

See also 
Communications in Israel
Economy of Israel

References

1984 establishments in Israel
Companies based in Tel Aviv
Companies listed on the Tel Aviv Stock Exchange
Internet service providers of Israel
Israeli brands
Telecommunications companies of Israel
Formerly government-owned companies of Israel
Holding companies established in 1999